Lake Sysmä is a medium-sized lake in the Vuoksi main catchment area. It is located in the Northern Karelia region in eastern  Finland. It is situated in the municipality of Ilomantsi.

Biggest islands are Lammassaari, Korpisaari, Veitsisaari and Kokkosaari.

Sysmä is also the name of a municipality in Päijänne Tavastia region and Sysmä is also a lake in Joroinen.

See also
List of lakes in Finland

References

Lakes of Ilomantsi